Ak Ishan is a shrine in the Ahal Region of Turkmenistan. It is one of the most popular pilgrimage-sites in the country.

References 

Ahal Region
Shrines in Turkmenistan